The 2016 VTV Cup Championship was the 13th staging of the international tournament. The tournament was held at the Hà Nam Gymnasium in Hà Nam, Vietnam.

Pool composition
6 teams were set to participate at the tournament.
 (hosts)

 Tangzhang Middle School
 Chinzei Gakuin High School
 Supreme Chonburi

Preliminary round

|}

|}

|}

|}

|}

|}

Fixtures: Thể Thao Việt Nam

Final round

Semifinals

|}

5th place

|}

3rd place

|}

Final

|}

Final standing

Awards

Most Valuable Player
 Manganang Aprilia Santini
Best Outside Spikers
 Trần Thị Thanh Thuý
 Wilavan Apinyapong
Best Setter
 Soraya Phomla

Best Opposite Spiker
 Fatou Diouck
Best Middle Blockers
 Chloe Mann
 Lê Thanh Thuý
Best Libero
 Nguyen Thi Kim Lien
Miss VTV Cup 2016
 Nandita Ayu Salsabila

References

VTV International Women's Volleyball Cup
Voll
2016 in women's volleyball